Bryan Thao Worra (born January 1, 1973) is a Laotian American writer. His books include On The Other Side Of The Eye, Touching Detonations, Winter Ink, Barrow and The Tuk Tuk Diaries: My Dinner With Cluster Bombs. He is the first Laotian American to receive a Fellowship in Literature from the United States government's National Endowment for the Arts. He received the Asian Pacific Leadership Award from the State Council on Asian Pacific Minnesotans for Leadership in the Arts in 2009. He received the Science Fiction Poetry Association Elgin Award for Book of the Year in 2014. He was selected as a Cultural Olympian representing Laos during the 2012 London Summer Olympics. He is the first Asian American president of the international Science Fiction and Fantasy Poetry Association, and the first Laotian American member of the professional Horror Writers Association.

Family and early years
Bryan Thao Worra was born Thao Somnouk Silosoth in Vientiane, capital of the Kingdom of Laos, on January 1, 1973, during the Laotian Civil War (1954–1975).

He came to the United States in July 1973. Bryan Thao Worra's early years were spent in Missoula, Montana, Anchorage, Alaska, and Saline, Michigan. Thao Worra currently resides in the Hawthorne neighborhood of Minneapolis, Minnesota, and between 2012-2017 split his time between several cities in California, including the city of Hemet, California, Ukiah, California, Dublin, California, and Pasadena, California.

Thao Worra was adopted when he was three days old by an American pilot named John Worra, who flew for Royal Air Lao, a civilian airline company. Thao Worra's cousin, Dr. Caroline Worra, is an opera singer and educator.

In 2003, Thao Worra reunited with his biological family after nearly 30 years during a visit to Laos. He has three biological sisters and one brother on his mother's side. His mother was Nang Mitthalinh Silosot, who was also adopted. His father was Thao Souphanh, who is believed deceased.

Education
Thao Worra attended several private Lutheran elementary schools in Alaska and Michigan. In the 1980s, Thao Worra attended the Rudolf Steiner School of Ann Arbor, where he received a Waldorf education. He attended Saline, Michigan public high school and graduated in 1991. In high school, he had a significant interest in social studies, literature and mythology and was a member of the quiz bowl team and the National Honor Society. He was briefly involved with Future Problem Solvers.

Thao Worra attended Otterbein College in Westerville, Ohio from 1991 to 1997, studying communications and philosophy/religion with a focus on non-Western cultures. In college, Thao Worra was active in numerous campus activities including the political affairs club, Phi Eta Sigma, the campus programming board and the Sigma Delta Phi Fraternity. In college, he was active in community service and received numerous awards for his writing and student leadership, including the Roy Burkhart Prize for Religious Poetry.

Writing
Thao Worra has written creatively from an early age, but began seriously writing in 1991. Some of his earliest writing first appeared in the Otterbein College literary magazine Quiz and Quill and the campus newspaper, the Tan and Cardinal. He often performed in the Otterbein College Philomathean Room in Towers Hall, and at local coffee houses in Westerville.

A widely published Laotian writer, Thao Worra's work appears in over 90 publications including the Bamboo Among the Oaks anthology, the journalsWhistling Shade, Urban Pioneer, Unarmed, the Asian Pacific Journal and the Journal of the Asian American Renaissance and the anthology Outsiders Within. In 2011 he was approved as an active member of the Horror Writers Association. He holds active membership in the Science Fiction Poetry Association.

Thao Worra's writing explores many themes including transience, identity and home. His style is frequently experimental and draws from a variety of modern and contemporary influences, including science fiction and horror. In interviews, he has cited numerous literary influences including Franz Kafka, Jorge Luis Borges, Samuel Beckett, H.P. Lovecraft, Larry Hama, Yusef Komunyakaa, Heather McHugh, Tadeusz Borowski, Adrienne Su, Leonard Cohen, Tom Waits, Khalil Gibran, Joseph Campbell, Hermann Hesse and Shuntaro Tanikawa.

Many of his latter poems are influenced by his travels abroad, especially 2002-2003 when he traveled to Asia, Europe and Egypt, and from his travels to Southeast Asian American enclaves across the United States. He makes collections of his poetry available for free online in e-chapbooks to increase accessibility of his work to Laotian and Hmong audiences.

Thao Worra's chapbook The Tuk-Tuk Diaries: My Dinner With Clusterbombs was printed by Unarmed Press in 2003 in a limited edition.  Sphinx House Press released Touching Detonations in the same year, exploring the issue of unexploded ordnance in Laos. These were the first works to emerge from his first return to Laos.

Thao Worra's first full-length book of speculative poetry, On The Other Side Of The Eye was released in August 2007 from Sam's Dot Publishing, based in Iowa. Sam's Dot Publishing specializes in speculative literature.

Thao Worra's follow-up book of speculative poetry, BARROW was released by Sam's Dot Publishing in 2009. Winter Ink was released in December 2008 from the Minnesota Center for Book Arts. In the summer of 2009, he released an additional book of poetry, Tanon Sai Jai based on the Lao American journey. Tanon Sai Jai included many references to other Laotian-American writers and their books, including the work of Thavisouk Phrasavath, Phayvanh Luekhamhan, Catzie Vilayphonh of Yellow Rage, and Saymoukda Vongsay.

A new book of speculative poetry, DEMONSTRA, was released by Innsmouth Free Press in 2013, featuring artwork by Lao American artist Vongduane Manivong.

Thao Worra was a 2002 Minnesota Playwrights' Center Many Voices Fellow. His play Black Box was performed at the Sex/No Sex Festival, Ensemble Studio Theater, New York, NY in November 2006. He also assisted in the editing of the modernized theater adaptation of Phadaeng and Nang Ai, a traditional Lao/Isan Love Story by Suthasinee Srisawat in May 2007 for Bakka Magazine.

Thao Worra was an active member of the SatJaDham Lao Literary Project, working to promote the work of Laotian and Hmong artists and writers. Thao Worra organized several public readings and exhibitions of Laotian and Asian American artists in Minnesota, including Emerging Voices (2002), The Five Senses Show (2002), Lao'd and Clear (2004), and Giant Lizard Theater (2005). He has assisted and performed with professional storytelling groups in Minnesota. He was a key figure in convening the National Lao American Writers Summit in Minneapolis, Minnesota in August 2010. He also organized the Legacies of War: Refugee Nation exhibit and multidisciplinary arts festival in October 2010 at Intermedia Arts in Minneapolis.

Thao Worra often writes as a freelance reporter for several Asian American newspapers including Asian American Press, interviewing numerous Asian American artists and covering community events. He is a regular contributor to the Twin Cities Daily Planet. He has written op-ed columns for the Pioneer Press and community newspapers, primarily on Asian American subjects. He is also a frequent writer for Little Laos on the Prairie, a Minnesota-based Lao American online publication founded by Chanida Phaengdara Potter.

Career and community service
Thao Worra typically works with community service agencies such as Hmong National Development, the National Youth Leadership Council, Asian Media Access, and Little Brothers – Friends of the Elderly, the Lao Assistance Center and the Hawthorne Neighborhood Council. In the 2000s, he volunteered extensively with the Hmong American Institute for Learning and briefly served as its interim executive director in 2005.

Thao Worra has been a consultant to the Minnesota State Arts Board, the Minnesota Historical Society, the Minnesota Humanities Commission, and Legacies of War, a non-profit organization that addresses issues of unexploded ordnance in Laos. He has presented for the Smithsonian Asian Pacific American Center, including their CTRL+ALT Culture Lab on Imagined Futures in November 2016 in New York and the 2019 Asian American Literature Festival in Washington D.C.

Thao Worra was an early volunteer of AsianAmericanPoetry.com as a member of their advisory board. He served briefly as a volunteer editor of Bakka Magazine, a Lao literary journal. He frequently contributes to Little Laos on the Prairie, a Minnesota-based blog serving the Lao American community. In 2008, he was elected the president of SF Minnesota and continues to assist them since the expiration of his term.
He has served as the creative works editor of the Journal of Southeast Asian American Education and Advancement since 2008.  In 2014 he joined Sahtu Press, a non-profit Lao American literary publisher in the San Francisco Bay Area.

Thao Worra is a member of the Asian/Pacific American Librarians Association. In 2009, he was elected to the board of directors of the Loft Literary Center to serve a three-year term. From 2012 to 2014, he led a regular literary discussion group at the Hemet Public Library in Hemet, California.

Thao Worra became the treasurer of the Science Fiction Poetry Association in 2013, and was elected president of the organization in 2016.

Selected works
Before We Remember, We Dream. Sahtu Press, 2020.
DEMONSTRA, Innsmouth Free Press, 2013.
Tanon Sai Jai, Silosoth Publishing, 2009
BARROW, Sam's Dot Publishing, 2009.
Winter Ink, Minnesota Center For Book Arts, 2008.
On The Other Side Of The Eye, Sam's Dot Publishing, 2007.
My Dinner With Cluster Bombs (The Tuk-Tuk Diaries), Unarmed Press Chapbook, 2003.
Touching Detonations, Sphinx House Press e-chapbook, 2003.

Awards and recognition
Bryan Thao Worra holds over 20 awards for his literary work and community service, including his arts leadership. In 2009, Thao Worra became the first Laotian American writer to receive a fellowship in literature from the United States government's National Endowment for the Arts to continue his work as a poet. NEA Literature Fellowships are awarded to published creative writers of exceptional talent in the areas of prose and poetry to advance the goal of encouraging and supporting artistic creativity and preserving the diverse cultural heritage of the United States.

He was recognized in 2009 by the State Council on Asian Pacific Minnesotans with the Asian Pacific Leadership Award for Excellence in the Arts. In 2010, he was recognized by the Lao Professionals of Elgin, Illinois with their Literacy Award at the 2010 Lao Artists Festival. In 2014, his poetry collection DEMONSTRA received the Science Fiction Poetry Association's Elgin Award for Book of the Year. In 2015, NBC News highlighted him in their feature "National Poetry Month: Asian-American Poets to Watch." In 2017, he was the first Artist-In-Residence for the University of California Merced's Center for the Humanities. Thao Worra was named a Joyce Award winner in 2019 and was awarded $50,000 in conjunction with the Lao Assistance Center to produce Laomagination: 45, an  exhibition presenting multi-generational stories of the Lao community.

2019 Joyce Award winner
2017 University of CA Merced Center for the Humanities Artist-In-Residence
2015 NBC Asian American Poet to Watch
2014 Elgin Award for Book of the Year, Science Fiction Poetry Association
2014 Bronze Medal, Poetry World Cup, Missing Slate Magazine
2014 Reader's Choice Award-Poetry, Strange Horizons
2012 Cultural Olympian, Lao Delegate, 20123 London Summer Olympics
2011 Youth Media Innovation Award, University of Minnesota Human Rights Center
2011 Artist Initiative Grant, Minnesota State Arts Board.
2010 Literacy Award, Lao Professionals of Illinois.
2009 Certificate of Honor, City and County of San Francisco
2009 National Endowment for the Arts, Fellowship in Literature for Poetry.
2009 Asian Pacific Leadership Award, State Council on Asian Pacific Minnesotans.
2008 Artists Initiative Grant, Minnesota State Arts Board.
2007 Career Initiative Grant, Loft Literary Center.
2005 Minnesota State Arts Board Cultural Collaboration Award with Mali Kouanchao.
2002 Minnesota Playwrights Center Many Voices Artist-In-Residence.
1994 Otterbein College Quiz and Quill Poetry Contest, First and Third Place.
1994 Otterbein College Quiz and Quill Walter Lowre Barnes Short Story Contest, First Place.
1994 Otterbein College Quiz and Quill Roy Burkhart Religious Poetry Contest, Second Place.
1993 Otterbein College Quiz and Quill Personal Essay Contest, First Place.
1993 Otterbein College Quiz and Quill Roy Burkhart Religious Poetry Contest, Second Place.
1991-1992 Otterbein College Quiz and Quill Poetry Contest, Second Place.
1991 James E. Casey Memorial Scholarship.
1991 Otterbein College Ammons-Thomas Award.
1991 National Honor Society Debra Kolander Service Scholarship, Saline High School.

References

External links
Bryan Thao Worra's blog
Older version of Bryan Thao Worra's blog
Interviews with Bryan Thao Worra between 2007-2017
Bryan Thao Worra on Goodreads.com
Fangoria Magazine "Horror Poet Bryan Thao Worra Takes Book of the Year"
NBC News: National Poetry Month: Asian-American Poets to Watch
Science Fiction Poetry Association 2014 Elgin Awards
Missing Slate Poetry World Cup
Lao writer uses talents to help others
Asianweek Interview with Bryan Thao Worra
2.1.5. Magazine Interview with Bryan Thao Worra
Saline Reporter Interview with Bryan Thao Worra
Fourth Estate article on Bryan Thao Worra
A Hmong Times Interview With Bryan Thao Worra.
University of Wisconsin Green Bay Press Release
A Voice of America Interview With Bryan Thao Worra
Whistling Shade Review of Bryan Thao Worra's chapbook Touching Detonations
Whistling Shade Review of Bryan Thao Worra's book On The Other Side Of The Eye
Bryan Thao Worra on Boston Progress Radio

American people of Laotian descent
American people of Hmong descent
Writers from Minneapolis
Otterbein University alumni
Writers from Missoula, Montana
Waldorf school alumni
Laotian poets
People from Vientiane
1973 births
Living people
American writers of Laotian descent
American writers of Hmong descent
Laotian writers
People from Saline, Michigan